Mohammad-Hossein Malekzadegan (b. 1944) is an Iranian retired military officer who served as the Commander of the Islamic Republic of Iran Navy from 1985 to 1989. As of 2016, he was a board member of Chabahar Free Trade-Industrial Zone.

Malekzadegan ranked captain when he was appointed to the position on 27 June 1985, having previously served as the commander of the south fleet in the Persian Gulf and the Gulf of Oman since June 1983, and a deputy to the navy commander after 10 October 1980. According to Pierre Razoux, his appointment "reinvigorated" Iran's regular naval forces that were in a rivalry with the Navy of the Islamic Revolutionary Guard Corps.

See also
 List of Iranian commanders in the Iran–Iraq War

References

Commanders of Islamic Republic of Iran Navy
Islamic Republic of Iran Navy commodores
Islamic Republic of Iran Army personnel of the Iran–Iraq War
Living people
1944 births